MASP is an abbreviation for:
 São Paulo Museum of Art (in Portuguese, Museu de Arte de São Paulo) 
 Mid Atlantic Star Party
MASP (protein)
MASP1 (protein)
MASP2 (protein)